Byron Kim (born in 1961 in La Jolla, California) is a contemporary artist who lives and works in Brooklyn, New York. In the early 1990s he produced minimalist paintings exploring racial identity. He graduated from Yale University in 1983 where he was a member of Manuscript Society.

Works
Kim's work in the early 1990s consisted of monochrome canvases depicting the skin tones of friends and family. He gained early recognition for Synecdoche, his contribution to the 1993 Whitney Biennial, which embodied the aesthetic and political aspirations of the art in that year's exhibition. Synecdoche (1991–1992) is a grid of 400 small, monochromatic paintings.  Each panel recreates the skin color of an individual who sat for Kim while he painted their portrait. Although the works, at first glance, resemble minimalist paintings of the 1960s the racial and political dimensions became apparent after reading in the exhibition catalogue how the works came about.

These monochrome canvases were followed by two or three-zoned canvases that color-sampled objects, sites or people. Kim collaborated with artist Glenn Ligon on Black & White (1993), part of a series critiquing the 'prejudices' of art materials, specifically the hues of 'Flesh'-colored tubes of paint. 46 Halsey Drive Wallingford CT (1995) records his family members' various recollections of the color of a home Kim lived in as a child.  Other works employ a more naturalistic approach to represent details such as the palms of the artist's hands, or the whorls in his children's hair.

Kim also paints landscapes and makes photographic assemblages.

See also
 Inside the Artist's Studio, Princeton Architectural Press, 2015.

References

American contemporary painters
20th-century American painters
American male painters
21st-century American painters
21st-century American male artists
1961 births
Living people
People from La Jolla, San Diego
20th-century American male artists